Christiane Wiles (born 7 October 1952) is a French diver. She competed in the women's 3 metre springboard event at the 1972 Summer Olympics.

References

1952 births
Living people
French female divers
Olympic divers of France
Divers at the 1972 Summer Olympics
Place of birth missing (living people)
20th-century French women